Kolar Lok Sabha constituency is one of the 28 Lok Sabha constituencies in Karnataka.  This constituency is reserved for the Scheduled Castes.

Jurisdiction
The places under Kolar ( ಕೋಲಾರ / कोलार ) Lok Sabha Constituency :

1951 Delimitation
Kolar District
Kolar District (Current)
Part of Tumkur District
 Part of Sira Taluk
Sira Hobli
Gowdagere Hobli
Hulikunte Hobli
Kallambella Hobli

Vidhan Sabha segments
Presently, Kolar Lok Sabha constituency comprises the following eight Legislative Assembly segments:

Members of Lok Sabha

Election results

2019 Lok Sabha Elections

2014 Lok Sabha

2009 Lok Sabha

See also
 Kolar district
 List of Constituencies of the Lok Sabha

References

External links
Election Statistics, Election Commission of India
Kolar lok sabha  constituency election 2019 date and schedule

Lok Sabha constituencies in Karnataka
Kolar district